In ring theory, a branch of abstract algebra, an ideal of a ring is a special subset of its elements. Ideals generalize certain subsets of the integers, such as the even numbers or the multiples of 3. Addition and subtraction of even numbers preserves evenness, and multiplying an even number by any integer (even or odd) results in an even number; these closure and absorption properties are the defining properties of an ideal.  An ideal can be used to construct a quotient ring in a way similar to how, in group theory, a normal subgroup can be used to construct a quotient group.

Among the integers, the ideals correspond one-for-one with the non-negative integers: in this ring, every ideal is a principal ideal consisting of the multiples of a single non-negative number. However, in other rings, the ideals may not correspond directly to the ring elements, and certain properties of integers, when generalized to rings, attach more naturally to the ideals than to the elements of the ring. For instance, the prime ideals of a ring are analogous to prime numbers, and the Chinese remainder theorem can be generalized to ideals.  There is a version of unique prime factorization for the ideals of a Dedekind domain (a type of ring important in number theory).

The related, but distinct, concept of an ideal in order theory is derived from the notion of ideal in ring theory. A fractional ideal is a generalization of an ideal, and the usual ideals are sometimes called integral ideals for clarity.

History 
Ernst Kummer invented the concept of ideal numbers to serve as the "missing" factors in number rings in which unique factorization fails; here the word "ideal" is in the sense of existing in imagination only, in analogy with "ideal" objects in geometry such as points at infinity.
In 1876, Richard Dedekind replaced Kummer's undefined concept by concrete sets of numbers, sets that he called ideals, in the third edition of Dirichlet's book Vorlesungen über Zahlentheorie, to which Dedekind had added many supplements.
Later the notion was extended beyond number rings to the setting of polynomial rings and other commutative rings by David Hilbert and especially Emmy Noether.

Definitions and motivation 
For an arbitrary ring , let  be its additive group. A subset  is called a left ideal of  if it is an additive subgroup of  that "absorbs multiplication from the left by elements of "; that is,  is a left ideal if it satisfies the following two conditions:
  is a subgroup of 

A two-sided ideal is a left ideal that is also a right ideal, and is sometimes simply called an ideal. In the language of modules, the definitions mean that a left (resp. right, two-sided) ideal of R is an R-submodule of R when R is viewed as a left (resp. right, bi-) R-module. When R is a commutative ring, the definitions of left, right, and two-sided ideal coincide, and the term ideal is used alone.

To understand the concept of an ideal, consider how ideals arise in the construction of rings of "elements modulo".  For concreteness, let us look at the ring ℤ/nℤ of integers modulo n given integer  (note that ℤ is a commutative ring).  The key observation here is that we obtain ℤ/nℤ by taking the integer line ℤ and wrapping it around itself so that various integers get identified.  In doing so, we must satisfy 2 requirements: 

1) n must be identified with 0 since n is congruent to 0 modulo n. 

2) the resulting structure must again be a ring. 

The second requirement forces us to make additional identifications (i.e., it determines the precise way in which we must wrap ℤ around itself).  The notion of an ideal arises when we ask the question: What is the exact set of integers that we are forced to identify with 0?  The answer is, unsurprisingly, the set  of all integers congruent to 0 modulo n.  That is, we must wrap ℤ around itself infinitely many times so that the integers ..., ... will all align with 0.  If we look at what properties this set must satisfy in order to ensure that ℤ/nℤ is a ring, then we arrive at the definition of an ideal.  Indeed, one can directly verify that nℤ is an ideal of ℤ.

Remark. Identifications with elements other than 0 also need to be made.  For example, the elements in  must be identified with 1, the elements in  must be identified with 2, and so on.  Those, however, are uniquely determined by nℤ since ℤ is an additive group.

We can make a similar construction in any commutative ring R: start with an arbitrary , and then identify with 0 all elements of the ideal   It turns out that the ideal xR is the smallest ideal that contains x, called the ideal generated by x.  More generally, we can  start with an arbitrary subset , and then identify with 0 all the elements in the ideal generated by S: the smallest ideal (S) such that .  The ring that we obtain after the identification depends only on the ideal (S) and not on the set S that we started with.  That is, if , then the resulting rings will be the same.

Therefore, an ideal I of a commutative ring R captures canonically the information needed to obtain the ring of elements of R modulo a given subset .  The elements of I, by definition, are those that are congruent to zero, that is, identified with zero in the resulting ring.  The resulting ring is called the quotient of R by I and is denoted R/I.  Intuitively, the definition of an ideal postulates two natural conditions necessary for I to contain all elements designated as "zeros" by R/I:
 Any  multiplied by a "zero"  is a "zero" .
It turns out that the above conditions are also sufficient for I to contain all the necessary "zeros": no other elements have to be designated as "zero" in order to form R/I.  (In fact, no other elements should be designated as "zero" if we want to make the fewest identifications.)

Remark. The above construction still works using two-sided ideals even if R is not necessarily commutative.

Examples and properties 
(For the sake of brevity, some results are stated only for left ideals but are usually also true for right ideals with appropriate notation changes.)
 In a ring R, the set R itself forms a two-sided ideal of R called the unit ideal. It is often also denoted by  since it is precisely the two-sided ideal generated (see below) by the unity . Every (left, right or two-sided) ideal contains the zero ideal and is contained in the unit ideal.
 An (left, right or two-sided) ideal that is not the unit ideal is called a proper ideal (as it is a proper subset). Note: a left ideal  is proper if and only if it does not contain a unit element, since if  is a unit element, then  for every . Typically there are plenty of proper ideals. In fact, if R is a skew-field, then  are its only ideals and conversely: that is, a nonzero ring R is a skew-field if  are the only left (or right) ideals. (Proof: if  is a nonzero element, then the principal left ideal  (see below) is nonzero and thus ; i.e.,  for some nonzero . Likewise,  for some nonzero . Then .)
This is because the sum of any even integers is even, and the product of any integer with an even integer is also even. Similarly, the set of all integers divisible by a fixed integer n is an ideal denoted .
 The set of all polynomials with real coefficients which are divisible by the polynomial x2 + 1 is an ideal in the ring of all polynomials.
 The set of all n-by-n matrices whose last row is zero forms a right ideal in the ring of all n-by-n matrices. It is not a left ideal. The set of all n-by-n matrices whose last column is zero forms a left ideal but not a right ideal.
Thus, a skew-field is simple and a simple commutative ring is a field. The matrix ring over a skew-field is a simple ring.
By definition, and thus if  is not the zero ring (so ), then  is a proper ideal. More generally, for each left ideal I of S, the pre-image  is a left ideal. If I is a left ideal of R, then  is a left ideal of the subring  of S: unless f is surjective,  need not be an ideal of S; see also #Extension and contraction of an ideal below.
Moreover, for commutative rings, this bijective correspondence restricts to prime ideals, maximal ideals, and radical ideals (see the Types of ideals section for the definitions of these ideals).
 (For those who know modules) If M is a left R-module and  a subset, then the annihilator  of S is a left ideal.
Then the union  is a left ideal of R. (Note: this fact remains true even if R is without the unity 1.)
Such an ideal exists since it is the intersection of all left ideals containing X. Equivalently,  is the set of all the (finite) left R-linear combinations of elements of X over R:

(since such a span is the smallest left ideal containing X.) A right (resp. two-sided) ideal generated by X is defined in the similar way. For "two-sided", one has to use linear combinations from both sides; i.e.,

 In the ring  of integers, every ideal can be generated by a single number (so  is a principal ideal domain), as a consequence of Euclidean division (or some other way).
There is a bijective correspondence between ideals and congruence relations (equivalence relations that respect the ring structure) on the ring: Given an ideal I of a ring R, let  if .  Then ~ is a congruence relation on R. Conversely, given a congruence relation ~ on R, let .  Then I is an ideal of R.

Types of ideals 
To simplify the description all rings are assumed to be commutative. The non-commutative case is discussed in detail in the respective articles.

Ideals are important because they appear as kernels of ring homomorphisms and allow one to define factor rings. Different types of ideals are studied because they can be used to construct different types of factor rings.

 Maximal ideal: A proper ideal I is called a maximal ideal if there exists no other proper ideal J with I a proper subset of J.  The factor ring of a maximal ideal is a simple ring in general and is a field for commutative rings.
 Minimal ideal: A nonzero ideal is called minimal if it contains no other nonzero ideal.
 Prime ideal: A proper ideal I is called a prime ideal if for any a and b in R, if ab is in I, then at least one of a and b is in I. The factor ring of a prime ideal is a prime ring in general and is an integral domain for commutative rings.
 Radical ideal or semiprime ideal: A proper ideal I is called radical or semiprime if for any a in R, if an is in I for some n, then a is in I. The factor ring of a radical ideal is a semiprime ring for general rings, and is a reduced ring for commutative rings.
 Primary ideal: An ideal I is called a primary ideal if for all a and b in R, if ab is in I, then at least one of a and bn is in I for some natural number n. Every prime ideal is primary, but not conversely. A semiprime primary ideal is prime.
 Principal ideal: An ideal generated by one element.
 Finitely generated ideal: This type of ideal is finitely generated as a module.
 Primitive ideal: A left primitive ideal is the annihilator of a simple left module.
 Irreducible ideal: An ideal is said to be irreducible if it cannot be written as an intersection of ideals which properly contain it.
 Regular ideal: This term has multiple uses. See the article for a list.
 Nil ideal:  An ideal is a nil ideal if each of its elements is nilpotent.
 Nilpotent ideal:  Some power of it is zero.
 Parameter ideal: an ideal generated by a system of parameters.

Two other important terms using "ideal" are not always ideals of their ring. See their respective articles for details:
Fractional ideal: This is usually defined when R is a commutative domain with quotient field K. Despite their names, fractional ideals are R submodules of K with a special property. If the fractional ideal is contained entirely in R, then it is truly an ideal of R.
Invertible ideal: Usually an invertible ideal A is defined as a fractional ideal for which there is another fractional ideal B such that .

Ideal operations 
The sum and product of ideals are defined as follows.

,
which is a left (resp. right) ideal,
and, if  are two-sided,

The distributive law holds for two-sided ideals ,
,
.
If a product is replaced by an intersection, a partial distributive law holds:

Remark: The sum and the intersection of ideals is again an ideal; with these two operations as join and meet, the set of all ideals of a given ring forms a complete modular lattice. The lattice is not, in general, a distributive lattice. The three operations of intersection, sum (or join), and product make the set of ideals of a commutative ring into a quantale.

If  are ideals of a commutative ring R, then  in the following two cases (at least) 

 is generated by elements that form a regular sequence modulo .
(More generally, the difference between a product and an intersection of ideals is measured by the Tor functor)

An integral domain is called a Dedekind domain if for each pair of ideals , there is an ideal  such that . It can then be shown that every nonzero ideal of a Dedekind domain can be uniquely written as a product of maximal ideals, a generalization of the fundamental theorem of arithmetic.

Examples of ideal operations 
In  we have

Let  and let . Then,
  and 
 
 
  while 
In the first computation, we see the general pattern for taking the sum of two finitely generated ideals, it is the ideal generated by the union of their generators. In the last three we observe that products and intersections agree whenever the two ideals intersect in the zero ideal. These computations can be checked using Macaulay2.

Radical of a ring 

Ideals appear naturally in the study of modules, especially in the form of a radical.

For simplicity, we work with commutative rings but, with some changes, the results are also true for non-commutative rings.

Let R be a commutative ring. By definition, a primitive ideal of R is the annihilator of a (nonzero) simple R-module. The Jacobson radical  of R is the intersection of all primitive ideals. Equivalently,

Conversely, if  is a maximal ideal, then  is the annihilator of the simple R-module . There is also another characterization (the proof is not hard):

For a not-necessarily-commutative ring, it is a general fact that  is a unit element if and only if  is (see the link) and so this last characterization shows that the radical can be defined both in terms of left and right primitive ideals.

The following simple but important fact (Nakayama's lemma) is built-in to the definition of a Jacobson radical: if M is a module such that , then M does not admit a maximal submodule, since if there is a maximal submodule ,  and so , a contradiction. Since a nonzero finitely generated module admits a maximal submodule, in particular, one has:
If  and M is finitely generated, then 

A maximal ideal is a prime ideal and so one has

where the intersection on the left is called the nilradical of R. As it turns out,  is also the set of nilpotent elements of R.

(Proof: first note the DCC implies  for some n. If (DCC)  is an ideal properly minimal over the latter, then . That is, a contradiction.)

Extension and contraction of an ideal 

Let A and B be two commutative rings, and let f : A → B be a ring homomorphism. If  is an ideal in A, then  need not be an ideal in B (e.g. take f to be the inclusion of the ring of integers Z into the field of rationals Q). Explicitly,

Assuming f : A → B is a ring homomorphism,  is an ideal in A,  is an ideal in B, then:

  is prime in B   is prime in A.
 
 

It is false, in general, that  being prime (or maximal) in A implies that  is prime (or maximal) in B. Many classic examples of this stem from algebraic number theory. For example, embedding .

On the other hand, if f is surjective and  then:

  is a prime ideal in A   is a prime ideal in B.
  is a maximal ideal in A   is a maximal ideal in B.

Remark: Let K be a field extension of L, and let B and A be the rings of integers of K and L, respectively. Then B is an integral extension of A, and we let f be the inclusion map from A to B. The behaviour of a prime ideal  of A under extension is one of the central problems of algebraic number theory.

The following is sometimes useful: a prime ideal  is a contraction of a prime ideal if and only if . (Proof: Assuming the latter, note  intersects , a contradiction. The converse is obvious.)

Generalizations 
Ideals can be generalized to any monoid object , where  is the object where the monoid structure has been forgotten.
  is a subobject of 

A right ideal is defined with the condition "" replaced by "'". A two-sided ideal is a left ideal that is also a right ideal, and is sometimes simply called an ideal. When  is a commutative monoid object respectively, the definitions of left, right, and two-sided ideal coincide, and the term ideal is used alone.

An ideal can also be thought of as a specific type of -module.

See also 
 Modular arithmetic
 Noether isomorphism theorem
 Boolean prime ideal theorem
 Ideal theory
 Ideal (order theory)
 Ideal norm
 Splitting of prime ideals in Galois extensions
 Ideal sheaf

Notes

References 

Atiyah, M. F. and Macdonald, I. G., Introduction to Commutative Algebra, Perseus Books, 1969, 
 
 Michiel Hazewinkel, Nadiya Gubareni, Nadezhda Mikhaĭlovna Gubareni, Vladimir V. Kirichenko. Algebras, rings and modules. Volume 1. 2004. Springer, 2004.

External links 

 
Algebraic structures
Commutative algebra
Algebraic number theory